Víctor Ramón Ferreira Barrios (born 9 May 1986) is a Paraguayan footballer who plays for General Díaz.

In 2008 Ferreira played on loan for Godoy Cruz in Argentina.

Teams
 Cerro Porteño 2006–2008
 Godoy Cruz de Mendoza 2008
 Cerro Porteño 2009
 Guaraní 2010
 Cerro Porteño 2010
 Sol de América 2011
 Caracas FC 2012
 Unión La Calera 2012
 Real Garcilaso 2013–2015
 Ayacucho FC 2015-

Titles
 Cerro Porteño 2006 (Torneo Clausura Paraguayan Primera División Championship), 2009 (Torneo Apertura Paraguayan Primera División Championship)
 Guaraní 2010 (Torneo Apertura Paraguayan Primera División Championship)

External links
 
 
 Víctor Ramón Ferreira – Argentine Primera statistics at Fútbol XXI  
 Víctor Ramón Ferreira at BDFA.com.ar 

1986 births
Living people
Paraguayan footballers
Association football midfielders
Cerro Porteño players
Godoy Cruz Antonio Tomba footballers
Expatriate footballers in Argentina
Deportivo Binacional FC players
Club General Díaz (Luque) managers